Juan Enrique Krauss Rusque (born 25 August 1932) is a Chilean lawyer and politician who has served as deputy, minister and ambassador of Chile in Spain, Ecuador and Czech Republic.

In 1966, Krauss began his political career working for the State, which allowed him to rise once Eduardo Frei Montalva appointed him in 1968 as Ministry of Economy, Development and Reconstruccion. From 1971 to 1975, he was a member of the national board of his party as well as national councilor of it (1976−1989). The first office aforementioned helped him to be elected for the Chamber of Deputies for the period 1973−77, which was disrupted by the coup against Salvador Allende.

Returned the democracy in Chile, in early 1990s he was the Minister of Interior of Patricio Aylwin. Similarly, he was deputy (1998−2002) and failed to reach a seat the Senate in 2001. After that, both Ricardo Lagos and Michelle Bachelet appointed him as a diplomat in South American and European countries.

Political career

Rising: 1966−1989
Due to his career into the Ministry of the Interior during Eduardo Frei Montalva's Christian-democratic government (1964−1970), Krauss was appointed by him as Undersecretary of the Interior on 10 August 1966. Then, he rose when Frei appointed him as Minister of Economy, Development and Reconstruction, in which stayed for a brief period from 1968 to 1969.

In that way, in 1970, he was appointed national as head of Radomiro Tomic's presidential campaign, who was defeated by the Marxist candidate Salvador Allende. However, during Allende's government Krauss was a member of the National Television Council (CNTV; 1971−73) until his participation in the 1973 Parliamentary elections, where was elected as a deputy for the 21st Departmental Group of Temuco, Lautaro, Nueva Imperial, Pitrufquén and Villarrica for the legislative period 1973−77 (disrupted by Augusto Pinochet's coup d'état). Similarly, in that election he was elected with the third majority behind Rosendo Huenumán and Hardy Momberg Roa.

After the September 11th coup, he was an oppositor of Pinochet's military dictatorship and played a role as human rights lawyer in representation of the Vicariate of Solidarity (1976−90).

Concertación governments: 1990−2010
Once ended the Pinochet dictatorship, he was appointed by Patricio Aylwin as Minister of the Interior, office he performed during the whole 1990−94 period. Nevertheless, he had to face such complex episodes as the assassination of UDI senator Jaime Guzmán or the «Boinazo»: a «liaison exercise» that the Chilean Army realized near the Moneda Palace, which included commandos with war weapons surrounding the building.

After leaving the government, he worked in the legal area of Telefónica Chile, he was elected president of his party (1997) and also was elected deputy for the 1998−2002 period. However, in 1999, he resigned to the position after Andrés Zaldívar's crushing defeat in the Concertación primary elections, where the winner was Ricardo Lagos (PPD) with a 71% of the votes.

Already elected Lagos, in the Congress Krauss was a member of the Permanent Commission of Constitution, Legislation and Justice as well as of the Economy, Development and Reconstruction Commission. Later, in the 2001 parliamentary election, he run for a seat in the Senate in representation of the Tarapacá Region, but he failed to reach it after losing against the then PPD Fernando Flores and three other contenders.

During the rest of the 2000s, he was appointed as ambassador by the presidencies of Lagos (2000−06) and Michelle Bachelet (2006−10), who respectively sent him to Spain and Ecuador. Likewise, in 2009, he was appointed by Bachelet as Ambassador of Chile to Czech Republic.

Retirement from politics: 2010−present
Since 2010, he is retired from active politics.

Trivia
He is supporter of Colo-Colo.

References

External links
 BCN Profile

Living people
1932 births
20th-century Chilean politicians
21st-century Chilean politicians
Instituto Nacional General José Miguel Carrera alumni
University of Chile alumni
National Falange politicians
Christian Democratic Party (Chile) politicians
Politicians from Santiago